Brant Lake is a town in Lake County, South Dakota, United States. Its population was 56 as of the 2020 census. It was counted as a census-designated place prior to the 2020 census, as it had not yet incorporated. The town's residents voted to incorporate in a 61–9 vote on March 29, 2016.

Demographics

References

Towns in Lake County, South Dakota
Towns in South Dakota